The 2000 Pop Secret Microwave Popcorn 400 was the 31st stock car race of the 2000 NASCAR Winston Cup Series and  the 26th iteration of the event. The race was held on Sunday, October 22, 2000, in Rockingham, North Carolina, at North Carolina Speedway, a  permanent high-banked racetrack. The race took the scheduled 393 laps to complete. In the final 43 laps of the race, Robert Yates Racing driver Dale Jarrett would manage to make a pass for the lead and defend the field to take his 24th career NASCAR Winston Cup Series victory and his second and final victory of the season. To fill out the top 3,  Hendrick Motorsports driver Jeff Gordon and Robert Yates Racing driver Ricky Rudd would finish second and third, respectively.

Background 

North Carolina Speedway was opened as a flat, one-mile oval on October 31, 1965. In 1969, the track was extensively reconfigured to a high-banked, D-shaped oval just over one mile in length. In 1997, North Carolina Motor Speedway merged with Penske Motorsports, and was renamed North Carolina Speedway. Shortly thereafter, the infield was reconfigured, and competition on the infield road course, mostly by the SCCA, was discontinued. Currently, the track is home to the Fast Track High Performance Driving School.

Entry list 

 (R) denotes rookie driver.

Practice

First practice 
The first practice session was held on Friday, October 20, at 10:30 AM EST. The session would last for one hour and 45 minutes.

Second practice 
The second practice session was held on Saturday, October 21, at 8:00 AM EST. The session would last for one hour and 30 minutes.

Final practice 
The final practice session, sometimes referred to as Happy Hour, was held on Saturday, October 21, after the preliminary 2000 Sam's Club 200 NASCAR Busch Series race. The session would last for one hour.

Qualifying 
Qualifying was split into two rounds. The first round was held on Friday, October 20, at 2:00 PM EST. Each driver would have one lap to set a time. During the first round, the top 25 drivers in the round would be guaranteed a starting spot in the race. If a driver was not able to guarantee a spot in the first round, they had the option to scrub their time from the first round and try and run a faster lap time in a second round qualifying run, held on Saturday, October 21, at 9:30 AM EST. As with the first round, each driver would have one lap to set a time. Positions 26-36 would be decided on time, while positions 37-43 would be based on provisionals. Six spots are awarded by the use of provisionals based on owner's points. The seventh is awarded to a past champion who has not otherwise qualified for the race. If no past champion needs the provisional, the next team in the owner points will be awarded a provisional.

Five drivers would fail to qualify: Ted Musgrave, Rich Bickle, Steve Grissom, Hut Stricklin, and Stacy Compton.

Full qualifying results

Race results

References 

2000 NASCAR Winston Cup Series
NASCAR races at Rockingham Speedway
October 2000 sports events in the United States
2000 in sports in North Carolina